Camp Dawson may refer to:

Camp Dawson (New Jersey)
Camp Dawson (West Virginia)